The Golden West is an historic building in Portland, Oregon, United States. Located at the intersection of Broadway and Everett in northwest Portland's Pearl District, the structure is also known as the Broadmoor Hotel, Golden West Hotel, and New Golden West Building.

According to KOIN, the building is "one of the most important landmarks in Portland's Black history" and was "the center of Black life in Portland" during the early 1900s. The city has nominated the structure for inclusion on the National Register of Historic Places; the listing was approved in February 2022.

See also
 National Register of Historic Places listings in Northwest Portland, Oregon

References

External links

 
 Golden West at Central City Concern
 Golden West Hotel at the Oregon Encyclopedia

African-American history in Portland, Oregon
Buildings and structures in Portland, Oregon
Pearl District, Portland, Oregon
Hotel buildings on the National Register of Historic Places in Portland, Oregon